Hours of Work (Industry) Convention, 1919 is  an International Labour Organization Convention.

It was established in 1919:
Having decided upon the adoption of certain proposals with regard to the "application of the principle of the 8-hour working day or of the 48-hours week"...

Ratifications
As of 2013, the convention had been ratified by 52 states. Of these ratifying states, one—New Zealand—has subsequently denounced the treaty.

See also 
Hours of Work (Commerce and Offices) Convention, 1930

External links 
Text.
Ratifications.

Hours
Working time
Treaties concluded in 1919
Treaties entered into force in 1921
Treaties of the People's Republic of Angola
Treaties of Argentina
Treaties of the First Austrian Republic
Treaties of Bangladesh
Treaties of Belgium
Treaties of Bolivia
Treaties of the Kingdom of Bulgaria
Treaties of Burundi
Treaties of Canada
Treaties of Chile
Treaties of Colombia
Treaties of the Comoros
Treaties of Costa Rica
Treaties of Cuba
Treaties of Czechoslovakia
Treaties of the Czech Republic
Treaties of Djibouti
Treaties of the Dominican Republic
Treaties of Equatorial Guinea
Treaties of the French Third Republic
Treaties of Ghana
Treaties of the Kingdom of Greece
Treaties of Guatemala
Treaties of Guinea-Bissau
Treaties of Haiti
Treaties of British India
Treaties of the Iraqi Republic (1958–1968)
Treaties of Israel
Treaties of the Kingdom of Italy (1861–1946)
Treaties of Kuwait
Treaties of Latvia
Treaties of Lebanon
Treaties of the Libyan Arab Republic
Treaties of Lithuania
Treaties of Luxembourg
Treaties of Malta
Treaties of the People's Republic of Mozambique
Treaties of Myanmar
Treaties of Nicaragua
Treaties of Paraguay
Treaties of Peru
Treaties of the Portuguese First Republic
Treaties of the Kingdom of Romania
Treaties of Saudi Arabia
Treaties of Slovakia
Treaties of Spain under the Restoration
Treaties of the United Arab Emirates
Treaties of Uruguay
Treaties of Venezuela
Treaties of the United Arab Republic
1919 in labor relations